The Tunbao or Tunpu are an ethnic subgroup of the Han, located in Guizhou and Yunnan provinces, China. The Tunbao are descended from ethnic Han who were part of an army sent on an expedition to Guizhou during the reign of the Ming dynasty's Hongwu Emperor.  Long thought to have been a non-Han ethnic minority, their Han origins were proved by Japanese anthropologist Torii Ryuzo in 1896. The Tunbao have preserved much of their culture, costumes, and language from the Ming era.

The Tianlong Tunbao town, located near Anshun is a historic site where  Tunbao homes and customs have been preserved, including the traditional Dixi opera or "ground opera" performances.

References

Ethnic groups in Yunnan
Subgroups of the Han Chinese